The triathlon tournament at the 2018 Mediterranean Games took place on 23 June at the Altafulla Urban Circuit. Men's and women's tournament were held.

Medal summary

Events

References

External links
2018 Mediterranean Games – Triathlon

Sports at the 2018 Mediterranean Games
2018
Mediterranean Games